Franklin County is a county located in the U.S. state of Kentucky. As of the 2020 census, the population was 51,541. Its county seat is Frankfort, the state capital. The county was formed in 1795 from parts of Woodford, Mercer and Shelby counties, and was named after the American inventor and statesman Benjamin Franklin.
Franklin County is part of the Frankfort, Kentucky Micropolitan Statistical Area. It shares a name with Franklin County in Ohio, where Columbus is located. This makes it one of two pairs of capital cities in counties of the same name, along with Marion Counties in Oregon and Indiana.

History
The three original counties of Kentucky (Jefferson, Fayette and Lincoln counties) intersected in what is today Franklin County. Franklin County was established in 1795 from land given by Mercer, Shelby, and Woodford counties. Franklin was the 18th Kentucky county in order of formation.

Geography

Major highways
 Interstate 64
 US 127
 US 60
 US 421
 US 460
 KY 676

Adjacent counties
 Owen County (north)
 Scott County (east)
 Woodford County (southeast)
 Anderson County (south)
 Shelby County (west)
 Henry County (northwest)

Government and politics
In recent presidential elections the county has supported both Democrats and Republicans. In 2000 Democrat Al Gore won 50% of the vote to Republican George W. Bush's 47%. In 2004, Bush won 50% of the vote to Democrat John Kerry's 48%. In 2008 Republican John McCain defeated Democrat Barack Obama 49.47% to 48.87%, a difference of only 144 votes, only for Obama to narrowly edge out Mitt Romney in 2012. However, Donald Trump won the county in 2016. He won it again in 2020, but only by a slim margin of 248 votes.

Demographics

As of the census of 2000, there were 47,687 people, 19,907 households, and 12,840 families residing in the county. The racial makeup of the county was 87.98% White, 9.36% Black or African American, 0.13% Native American, 0.72% Asian, 0.02% Pacific Islander, 0.55% from other races, and 1.24% from two or more races. 1.11% of the population were Hispanic or Latino of any race.

There were 19,907 households, out of which 29.50% had children under the age of 18 living with them, 48.70% were married couples living together, 12.20% had a female householder with no husband present, and 35.50% were non-families. 30.40% of all households were made up of individuals, and 10.60% had someone living alone who was 65 years of age or older. The average household size was 2.30 and the average family size was 2.86.

22.60% of the population was under the age of 18, 9.70% from 18 to 24, 30.50% from 25 to 44, 24.90% from 45 to 64, and 12.30% who were 65 years of age or older. The median age was 37 years. For every 100 females, there were 93.70 males. For every 100 females age 18 and over, there were 89.70 males.

The median income for a household in the county was $40,011, and the median income for a family was $51,052. Males had a median income of $32,826 versus $26,201 for females. The per capita income for the county was $21,229. About 6.90% of families and 10.70% of the population were below the poverty line, including 12.80% of those under age 18 and 12.20% of those age 65 or over.

Education
The county is served by two public school districts: Franklin County Public Schools  and Frankfort Independent Schools .

Franklin County Public Schools
This district takes in almost all of the county, including the majority of the city of Frankfort. It operates the following schools:
 Bridgeport Elementary School (grades K-5)
 Collins Lane Elementary School (grades K-5)
 Early Childhood Education Center (grades K-1)
 Elkhorn Elementary School (grades 2-5)
 Hearn Elementary School (grades 2-5)
 Peaks Mill Elementary School (grades 2-5)
 Westridge Elementary School (grades K-5)
 Bondurant Middle School (grades 6-8)
 Elkhorn Middle School (grades 6-8)
 Franklin County High School (grades 9-12)
 Western Hills High School (grades 9-12)
 The Academy (grades 9-12) (For kids with problems/juveniles)
 Franklin County Career and Technical Center (grades 9-12) (Career center for all public high schools in the county.)

Frankfort Independent Schools
This district serves an area roughly covering the Frankfort neighborhoods known as "downtown", South Frankfort (the vicinity of the state capitol building), and Bellepoint. It operates two schools:
 Second Street School (grades K-6)
 Frankfort High School (grades 7-12)

Private schools
 Capital Day School (grades PreK-8)
 Frankfort Christian Academy (grades K-12)
 Good Shepherd Catholic School (grades PreK-8)

University
 Kentucky State University

Parks
 Capitol View Park
 Cove Spring Park and Nature Preserve
 Dolly Graham Park
 East Frankfort Park
 Josephine Sculpture Park
 Juniper Hill Park and Golf Course
 Lakeview Park and Golf Course
 Leslie Morris Park on Fort Hill:  of woodland overlooking downtown Frankfort.  It contains trails that guide visitors through the remains of earthwork forts that were the main defensive position for Union troops protecting the city during an 1864 Civil War skirmish.
 Riverview Park and riverside walk
 Todd Park

Communities
 Bridgeport
 Forks of Elkhorn
 Frankfort (county seat)
 Jett
 Switzer
 Peaks Mill
 Bald Knob, Kentucky

See also

 National Register of Historic Places listings in Franklin County, Kentucky

References

External links
 Franklin County web site
 Frankfort/Franklin County Tourist & Convention Commission

 
Kentucky counties
Frankfort, Kentucky micropolitan area
1795 establishments in Kentucky
Populated places established in 1795